Government Arts College, Dharmapuri, is a general degree college located in Dharmapuri, Tamil Nadu. our college Website address is http://www.gacdpi.ac.in.  It was established in the year 1965. The college is affiliated with Periyar University. This college offers different courses in arts, commerce and science.

Departments

Science
Physics
Chemistry
Mathematics
Statistics
Electronics
Botany
Zoology
Computer Science
Visual Communication
Fashion Technology
B.C.A.
Psychology

Arts and Commerce
Tamil
English
History
Economics
Business Administration
Commerce
Commerce (Computer Application)
co-operation
Social Work
Political Science

Accreditation
The college is  recognized by the University Grants Commission (UGC).

References

External links

Educational institutions established in 1965
1965 establishments in Madras State
Colleges affiliated to Periyar University